is a yuri science fiction light novel written by  and illustrated by . It was first published in Japan by ASCII Media Works under the Dengeki Bunko imprint on July 10, 2009. A manga adaptation, drawn by Tsunashima, was serialized in Dengeki Daioh starting on January 27, 2011, and published in Japan in a total of three tankōbon volumes. Both the novel and its manga adaptation are licensed by Seven Seas Entertainment for publication in North America.

Plot 
The narrative follows Marii Yukari, a junior high school student who possesses purple eyes via which she perceives all humans in her presence as robots, and has only a single friend, Manabu "Gaku" Hatou. Marii is enlisted into a secret organization that desires to take advantage of her powers, and becomes involved in a series of dangerous science experiments whose consequences ultimately force Gaku to make a difficult choice.

Publication 
A manga adaptation, drawn by Tsunashima, was serialized in Dengeki Daioh from January 27, 2011, and was published in a total of three volumes. In February 2022, Seven Seas Entertainment announced that they had licensed both the light novel and manga for publication in the English language within North America, and released the novel's English version on December 13, 2022. The manga's English version, which will be published in a single omnibus edition volume as Qualia the Purple: The Complete Manga Collection, is slated for publication on June 13, 2023.

Manga volume list

Reception 
Reviewing Qualia the Purple for Anime News Network, Christopher Farris generally praised the plot, characters, and science fiction elements of the story, and opined that the novel would work best if one went into the story knowing as little as possible about its plot twists. Farris described the early chapters of the story as "fun in an inoffensive way," and characterized it as deliberately light in tone in order to make readers more comfortable prior to its more serious plot developments. While Farris said that he greatly enjoyed the story overall, he felt that the "dense" descriptions of theoretical quantum physics topics (which he said could necessitate frequent rereading for some), and some darker turns later in the narrative, could alienate certain readers. Regarding the yuri components of the story, he said that they were not introduced in a manner that readers would anticipate (another factor he perceived as potentially alienating) but nonetheless said that this element of the story was effective and felt that it included "one of the most heartwarming, romantic applications of quantum physics you've yet seen." Farris also praised the English version and its prose, which he said "reads very well."

Maria Remivoza of CBR included the Qualia the Purple manga on a list of "10 Best Underrated Sci-Fi Manga". David Heath of Game Rant included Qualia in a list of "best" science fiction light novels that did not yet have an anime adaptation. Discussing the manga, Tito W. James of Comicon commended the ability of the narrative to "ground high concept quantum mechanics and philosophy in grounded, believable human emotion" and said that Qualia deserved an anime adaptation.

References 

2009 Japanese novels
Anime and manga based on light novels
ASCII Media Works manga
Dengeki Bunko
Dengeki Daioh
Japanese science fiction novels
Light novels
Science fiction anime and manga
Seven Seas Entertainment titles
Shōnen manga
Yuri (genre) anime and manga
Yuri (genre) light novels